This is a list of writers who advocated Christian Universalism—specifically, Trinitarian Universalism prior to the 1961 creation of the Unitarian Universalist Association. Early Christians—from the second through fourth centuries—have been catalogued by scholars Hosea Ballou (Ancient History of Universalism, 1828), John Wesley Hanson (Universalism: The Prevailing Doctrine of the Christian Church During Its First Five Hundred Years, 1899), George T. Knight (The New Schaff-Herzog Encyclopedia of Religious Knowledge, 1911), and Pierre Batiffol (Catholic Encyclopedia, 1914), but modern scholarship questions the claim that all of these individuals were believers in universal reconciliation. Some of those listed here may have simply believed in apokatastasis in the Jewish or early Christian sense, without any intention that all who had ever lived would be saved.

Several modern Christian theologians have been deemed "hopeful Universalists" for a belief in the possibility of universal reconciliation, but who did not claim it was a dogmatic fact—e.g. Karl Barth and Cormac Murphy-O'Connor.

Table

Notes
For example, Frederick W. Norris in the article on apocatastasis in 2004's The Westminster Handbook to Origen writes that "As far as we can tell, therefore, Origen never decided to stress exclusive salvation or universal salvation, to the strict exclusion of either case."

Works cited

References

See also

Apocatastasis
Christian Universalism
Universal reconciliation
Universalist Church of America
List of Unitarians, Universalists, and Unitarian Universalists

 
Universalists